The Teacher in Space Project (TISP) was a NASA program announced by Ronald Reagan in 1984 designed to inspire students, honor teachers, and spur interest in mathematics, science, and space exploration. The project would carry teachers into space as Payload Specialists (non-astronaut civilians), who would return to their classrooms to share the experience with their students.

NASA cancelled the program in 1990, following the death of its first participant, Christa McAuliffe, in the Space Shuttle Challenger disaster (STS-51-L) on January 28, 1986. NASA replaced Teachers in Space in 1998 with the Educator Astronaut Project, which required its participants to become astronaut Mission Specialists. The first Educator Astronauts were selected as part of NASA Astronaut Group 19 in 2004.

Barbara Morgan, who was selected as a mission specialist as part of NASA Astronaut Group 17 in 1998, has often been incorrectly referred to as an Educator Astronaut. However, she was selected as a mission specialist before the Educator Astronaut Project.

NASA programs
TISP was announced by President Ronald Reagan on August 27, 1984. Not members of NASA's Astronaut Corps, the teachers would fly as Payload Specialists and return to their classrooms after flight. More than 40,000 applications were mailed to interested teachers while 11,000 teachers sent completed applications to NASA.  Each application included a potential lesson that would be taught from space while on the Space Shuttle.  The applications were sorted and then sent to the various State Departments of Education, who were then responsible for narrowing down their state applicants to a final set of two each. These 114 applicants were notified of their selections and were gathered together for further selection processes down to ten finalists.  These were then trained for a time, and in 1985 NASA selected Christa McAuliffe to be the first teacher in space, with Barbara Morgan as her backup. McAuliffe was a high school social studies teacher from Concord, New Hampshire. She planned to teach two 15-minute lessons from the Space Shuttle.

McAuliffe died in the Space Shuttle Challenger disaster (STS-51-L) on January 28, 1986. After the accident, Reagan spoke on national television and assured the nation that the Teacher in Space program would continue. "We'll continue our quest in space", he said. "There will be more shuttle flights and more shuttle crews and, yes, more volunteers, more civilians, more teachers in space. Nothing ends here; our hopes and our journeys continue." However, NASA decided in 1990 that spaceflight was still too dangerous to risk the lives of civilian teachers, and eliminated the Teacher in Space project. Morgan returned to teaching in Idaho and later became a mission specialist on STS-118.

Educator Astronaut Project

In January 1998, NASA replaced the Teacher In Space project with the Educator Astronaut Project. Instead of training teachers for five months as Payload Specialists who would return to the classroom, the Educator Astronaut program required selectees to give up their teaching careers, move to Houston, and become Mission Specialists (full-time NASA astronauts).

The first three Educator Astronauts were selected in October 2004: Joseph Acaba, Richard Arnold and Dorothy Metcalf-Lindenburger. Acaba and Arnold flew aboard STS-119 in March 2009, and Metcalf-Lindenburger on STS-131 in April 2010.

Although many sources including some NASA ones incorrectly refer to Barbara Morgan (who flew on STS-118 in August 2007) as the first Educator Astronaut, she was actually selected as a standard mission specialist in 1998, before the Educator Astronaut Project was in place.

Private program
In the early 21st century, the Teacher in Space project was revived in the private sector. The development of reusable, suborbital launch vehicles by commercial companies makes it possible for nonprofit groups to contemplate sending large numbers of teachers into space. The new Teachers in Space program began in 2005. In March 2005, Teacher in Space candidate Pam Leestma, a second-grade teacher and cousin of Space Shuttle astronaut David Leestma, completed a training flight aboard a MiG-21 operated by X-Rocket, LLC.

Armadillo Aerospace, Masten Space Systems, PlanetSpace, Rocketplane Limited, Inc., and XCOR Aerospace pledged flights to the new Teachers in Space project. Advisors to the new Teachers in Space project include SpaceShipOne builder and Ansari X-Prize winner Burt Rutan, X-Prize founder Peter Diamandis, Apollo astronaut Buzz Aldrin, and private astronaut and X-Prize sponsor Anousheh Ansari.

The United States Rocket Academy partnered with the SFF in 2006, and worked to draft rules for a "pathfinder" competition to select the first Teachers in Space. The rules were announced at the Wirefly X PRIZE Cup Competition held at Holloman Air Force Base near Alamogordo, New Mexico in October 2007. Applications were accepted until November 4, 2008. On July 20, 2009, Teachers in Space announced its first group of "Pathfinders": astronaut teacher candidates.

On June 11, 2013, Embry-Riddle Aeronautical University’s new Commercial Space Operations degree program, the first of its kind in the world, announced they will sponsor the Teachers in Space summer workshops for the next five years, indicating their intent toward a continuing long term relationship as well as their sharing a vision to "...help students, teachers and organizers collaborate in bringing space education to every level, from K-12 to graduate programs."

In 2014, Program director Elizabeth Kennick incorporated the Teachers in Space project as an educational nonprofit in New York, spinning it off from the Space Frontier Foundation.  5 original Pathfinders (James Kuhl, Rachael Manzer, Lanette Oliver, Chantelle Rose, and Michael Schmidt) remain with the program, also Vice President Joe Latrell and several teacher volunteers.  Teachers in Space, Inc. has now flown two teacher/student designed experiments to International Space Station (ISS), launched and retrieved several high altitude balloons with data sensors, put teachers through astronaut training experiences including hypobaric chamber and centrifuge, and delivered weeklong professional development workshops for Science, Technology, Engineering and Math (STEM) teachers in California, Florida, Oklahoma, Texas, and Georgia.

See also
 Educator Astronaut Project
 STS-118

References

External links
Teachers in Space, Inc.
Ssep.ncesse.org
Spacesafetymagazine.com
Barbara Morgan-Astronaut, Teacher in Space, NEA Member
President Reagan's Remarks to the Finalists in the Teacher in Space Project (June 26, 1985)

NASA programs
Space Shuttle program
Science education
 
1984 establishments in the United States
1990 disestablishments in the United States
Space Shuttle Challenger disaster